Robert Lycke (born 7 June 1937) is a Belgian field hockey player. He competed in the men's tournament at the 1960 Summer Olympics.

References

External links
 

1937 births
Living people
Belgian male field hockey players
Olympic field hockey players of Belgium
Field hockey players at the 1960 Summer Olympics
Field hockey players from Brussels